Dag og Tid is a national weekly newspaper in Norway that uses the Nynorsk standard of the Norwegian language.

Dag og Tid was founded in 1962. Contrary to most other Norwegian newspapers, its circulation has recently increased significantly, nearly doubling over the last two decades.

History and profile
Dag og Tid was founded in 1962. The paper is published weekly. Its headquarters is located in Oslo.

Dag og Tid is politically independent, but editorially radical. It focuses on culture and politics. It is owned by various persons and groups. The current editor is Svein Gjerdåker.

In the 2010s, Dag og Tid was one of few Norwegian print newspapers with a substantial increase of readers. Its circulation in 2015 was 10,948, up from 7,228 copies in 2008.

Circulation
Numbers from the Norwegian Media Businesses' Association, Mediebedriftenes Landsforening.

 1993: 6263
 1994: 5886
 1995: 6011
 1996: 6375
 1997: 6728
 1998: 6766
 1999: 6319
 2000: 6318
 2001: 6671
 2002: 6519
 2003: 6982
 2004: 7029
 2005: 7054
 2006: 7206
 2007: 7228
 2008: 7223
 2009: 7531
 2010: 8338
 2011: 8729
 2012: 9132
 2013: 9582
 2014: 10764
 2015: 10914

See also
 Jon Hustad
 Agnes Ravatn

References

External links
 Website

1962 establishments in Norway
Newspapers published in Oslo
Norwegian-language newspapers
Nynorsk
Publications established in 1962
Weekly newspapers published in Norway